The Oregon Museum Tavern shooting occurred on May 7, 1981, at the Oregon Museum Tavern in Salem, Oregon.

Incident 
At the time of the incident, Lawrence William Moore was a 25-year-old unemployed mill worker from Scio, Oregon. On May 7th, 1981, at 10:30 PM, Moore walked into the crowded Oregon Museum Tavern on Front Street NE during a Ladies' night event. Without saying a word, he began to fire his 9mm Browning handgun.

Moore first fired at the bar, before turning the weapon at patrons who began to flee.

Throughout the shooting, he spent multiple magazines.
While reloading, he was overpowered and pinned to the ground by several of the patrons. He was held down until the police arrived.

3 people died on-site and 20 were wounded; one of whom died at the hospital later that night. Dennis Scharf eventually succumbed to his injuries nearly 32 years later. In the end, a total of 5 people lost their lives and 18 were injured.

Fatalities 
Lori J. Cunningham, 22 – died at the scene
John W. Cooper, 27 – died at the scene
Robert E. Hamblin, 24 – died at the scene
Allen L. Wilcox, 24 – died at hospital
Dennis Scharf, 56 – died January 19, 2013, due to complications from injuries sustained

Legal and aftermath 
At trial, beginning on October 6, 1981, he pleaded innocent to the murder charges, citing mental disease or defect as a defense; however, he admitted to being the gunman.
Moore stated the reason for the shooting that he was trying to apprehend members of a 'syndicate' of millionaires, Jews and criminals who had been trying to poison him.

Moore was subsequently found guilty of four counts of aggravated murder and sentenced to four life terms in prison.

Memorial 
The names of the deceased victims are included in a joint memorial wall at Oregon City's Mountain View Cemetery that memorializes some 390 people that were murdered. The memorial was dedicated by The Greater Portland Area chapter of Parents of Murdered Children.

See also 
List of massacres in the United States
List of rampage killers in the United States

References 

1981 in Oregon
1981 mass shootings in the United States
1981 murders in the United States
Attacks in the United States in 1981
Deaths by firearm in Oregon
History of Salem, Oregon
Mass murder in 1981
Mass shootings in Oregon
May 1981 events in the United States
Murder in Oregon
Mass shootings in the United States